Transmissions from Empire Algol is the second and final studio album by the Norwegian dark ambient project Neptune Towers, a similar-sounding follow-up to 1994's Caravans to Empire Algol, expanding on the same concept. It was released in 1995 by Moonfog Productions.

Track listing

Personnel
 Fenriz - keyboards, recording, producer, engineering

External links 
[ Allmusic.com]
Discogs.com

References 

1995 albums